Stevan Robert Harnad (Hernád István Róbert, Hesslein István, born June 2, 1945, Budapest) is a Hungarian-born cognitive scientist based in Montreal, Canada.

Education
Harnad was born in Budapest, Hungary. He did his undergraduate work at McGill University and his graduate work at Princeton University's Department of Psychology.  Harnad completed his Master of Arts degree in Psychology from McGill University in 1969, his Doctor of Philosophy degree from Princeton University in 1992. He was awarded an honorary doctorate by University of Liège in 2013.

Research 
Harnad's research interests are in cognitive science, open access and animal sentience. He is currently professor of psychology at Université du Québec à Montréal (UQAM), McGill University, and professor emeritus of cognitive science at the University of Southampton. Elected external member of the Hungarian Academy of Sciences in 2001 (resigned in protest, 8 October 2016), he was Canada Research Chair in cognitive science 2001–2015. His research is on categorization, and animal law.

See also
 List of animal rights advocates

References

See also 
 Subversive Proposal

External links
Interview by Marc Bekoff
Interview by Richard Poynder
Open Access Archivangelism Blog, Stevan Harnad's blog on Open Access
Publications by Harnad archived in  Archipel, Université du Québec à Montréal (UQAM)

Academics of the University of Southampton
Animal welfare scholars
Canada Research Chairs
Canadian people of Hungarian descent
Canadian cognitive scientists
Scientists from Budapest
Living people
McGill University Faculty of Science alumni
Princeton University alumni
Academic staff of the Université du Québec à Montréal
1945 births
Open access activists